Nizhnyaya Lukina Gora is a rural locality (a village) in Gorodetskoye Rural Settlement, Kichmengsko-Gorodetsky District, Vologda Oblast, Russia. The population was 12 as of 2002.

Geography 
Nizhnyaya Lukina Gora is located 22 km northwest of Kichmengsky Gorodok (the district's administrative centre) by road. Kichmenga is the nearest rural locality.

References 

Rural localities in Kichmengsko-Gorodetsky District